In mathematics, the base change theorems relate the direct image and the inverse image of sheaves. More precisely, they are about the base change map, given by the following natural transformation of sheaves:

where

Such theorems exist in different branches of geometry: for (essentially arbitrary) topological spaces and proper maps f, in algebraic geometry for (quasi-)coherent sheaves and f proper or g flat, similarly in analytic geometry, but also for étale sheaves for f proper or g smooth.

Introduction 
A simple base change phenomenon arises in commutative algebra when A is a commutative ring and B and A' are two A-algebras. Let . In this situation, given a B-module M, there is an isomorphism (of A' -modules):

Here the subscript indicates the forgetful functor, i.e.,  is M, but regarded as an A-module.
Indeed, such an isomorphism is obtained by observing 

Thus, the two operations, namely forgetful functors and tensor products commute in the sense of the above isomorphism.
The base change theorems discussed below are statements of a similar kind.

Definition of the base change map 

The base change theorems presented below all assert that (for different types of sheaves, and under various assumptions on the maps involved), that the following base change map

is an isomorphism, where

This map exists without any assumptions on the maps f and g.

and so 

The Grothendieck spectral sequence then gives the first map and the last map (they are edge maps) in:

Combining this with the above yields

The above-mentioned introductory example is a special case of this, namely for the affine schemes  and, consequently, and the quasi-coherent sheaf  associated to the B-module M.

It is conceptually convenient to organize the above base change maps, which only involve only a single higher direct image functor, into one which encodes all  at a time. In fact, similar arguments as above yield a map in the derived category of sheaves on S':

General topology

Proper base change
If X is a Hausdorff topological space, S is a locally compact Hausdorff space and f is universally closed (i.e.,  is a closed map for any continuous map ), then
the base change map

is an isomorphism.

and so for 

To encode all individual higher derived functors of  into one entity, the above statement may equivalently be rephrased by saying that the base change map

is a quasi-isomorphism.

 has extended the above theorem to non-abelian sheaf cohomology, i.e., sheaves taking values in simplicial sets (as opposed to abelian groups).

Direct image with compact support
If the map f is not closed, the base change map need not be an isomorphism, as the following example shows (the maps are the standard inclusions) :

To obtain a base-change result, the functor  (or its derived functor) has to be replaced by the direct image with compact support . For example, if  is the inclusion of an open subset, such as in the above example,  is the extension by zero, i.e., its stalks are given by

In general, there is a map , which is a quasi-isomorphism if f is proper, but not in general. The proper base change theorem mentioned above has the following generalization: there is a quasi-isomorphism

Base change for quasi-coherent sheaves

Proper base change
In this situation, the following statements hold:
 "Semicontinuity theorem":
 For each , the function  is upper semicontinuous.
 The function  is locally constant, where  denotes the Euler characteristic.
  "Grauert's theorem": if S is reduced and connected, then for each  the following are equivalent
 is constant.
  is locally free and the natural map

is an isomorphism for all .
Furthermore, if these conditions hold, then the natural map

is an isomorphism for all .
 If, for some p,  for all , then the natural map

is an isomorphism for all .

As the stalk of the sheaf  is closely related to the cohomology of the fiber of the point under f, this statement is paraphrased by saying that "cohomology commutes with base extension".

These statements are proved using the following fact, where in addition to the above assumptions : there is a finite complex  of finitely generated projective A-modules and a natural isomorphism of functors

on the category of -algebras.

Flat base change
The base change map

is an isomorphism for a quasi-coherent sheaf  (on ), provided that the map  is flat (together with a number of technical conditions: f needs to be a separated morphism of finite type, the schemes involved need to be Noetherian).

Flat base change in the derived category
A far reaching extension of flat base change is possible when considering the base change map

in the derived category of sheaves on S', similarly as mentioned above. Here  is the (total) derived functor of the pullback of -modules (because  involves a tensor product,  is not exact when  is not flat and therefore is not equal to its derived functor ).
This map is a quasi-isomorphism provided that the following conditions are satisfied:
.
 One of the following conditions is satisfied:

One advantage of this formulation is that the flatness hypothesis has been weakened.  However, making concrete computations of the cohomology of the left- and right-hand sides now requires the Grothendieck spectral sequence.

Base change in derived algebraic geometry
Derived algebraic geometry provides a means to drop the flatness assumption, provided that the pullback  is replaced by the homotopy pullback.

Then, assuming that the schemes (or, more generally, derived schemes) involved are quasi-compact and quasi-separated, the natural transformation

is a quasi-isomorphism for any quasi-coherent sheaf, or more generally a complex of quasi-coherent sheaves.
The afore-mentioned flat base change result is in fact a special case since for g flat the homotopy pullback (which is locally given by a derived tensor product) agrees with the ordinary pullback (locally given by the underived tensor product), and since the pullback along the flat maps g and g' are automatically derived (i.e.). The auxiliary assumptions related to the Tor-independence or Tor-amplitude in the preceding base change theorem also become unnecessary.

Variants and applications
Proper base change also holds in the context of complex manifolds and complex analytic spaces.
The theorem on formal functions is a variant of the proper base change, where the pullback is replaced by a completion operation.

The see-saw principle and the theorem of the cube, which are foundational facts in the theory of abelian varieties, are a consequence of proper base change.

A base-change also holds for D-modules: if X, S, X', and S' are smooth varieties (but f and g need not be flat or proper etc.), there is a quasi-isomorphism

where  and  denote the inverse and direct image functors for D-modules.

Base change for étale sheaves
For étale torsion sheaves , there are two base change results referred to as proper and smooth base change, respectively: base change holds if  is proper.

Then  are finite in each of the following cases:
X is complete, or 
 has no p-torsion, where p is the characteristic of k.

Under additional assumptions,  extended the proper base change theorem to non-torsion étale sheaves.

Applications
In close analogy to the topological situation mentioned above, the base change map for an open immersion f, 

is not usually an isomorphism. Instead the extension by zero functor  satisfies an isomorphism

This fact and the proper base change suggest to define the direct image functor with compact support for a map f by

where  is a compactification of f, i.e., a factorization into an open immersion followed by a proper map.
The proper base change theorem is needed to show that this is well-defined, i.e., independent (up to isomorphism) of the choice of the compactification.
Moreover, again in analogy to the case of sheaves on a topological space, a base change formula for  vs.  does hold for non-proper maps f.

It is an important variant of usual étale cohomology.

Similar ideas are also used to construct an analogue of the functor  in A1-homotopy theory.

See also
Grothendieck's relative point of view in algebraic geometry
Change of base (disambiguation)
Base change lifting of automorphic forms

Further reading

Notes

References 

 

 
 Gabber, "Finiteness theorems for étale cohomology of excellent schemes"

External links 
Brian Conrad's handout
Trouble with semicontinuity

Topology
Theorems in algebraic geometry
Sheaf theory
Geometry